The Palazzo delle Assicurazioni Generali, also known as Palazzo Venezia, is a historic building situated in Piazza Cordusio in Milan, Italy.

History 
The building was designed by the Italian architect Luca Beltrami to become the Milan headquarters of the Assicurazioni Generali insurance company. Construction began in 1897 and was completed in 1901.

Description 
The building is the focal point of Piazza Cordusio, a major square in the centre of Milan. It features a concave façade which accommodates a large niche with mosaics, and an octagonal cupola topped by a roof lantern.

References

External links

Buildings and structures in Milan